Pelphrey is a surname. Notable people with the surname include:

John Pelphrey (born 1968), American college basketball coach and player
Tom Pelphrey (born 1982), American actor

English-language surnames